Dr. Gurdial Singh Dhillon (6 August 1915 – 23 March 1992) was an Indian politician from the Indian National Congress party. He served as the Speaker of the Lok Sabha twice, President of the Inter-Parliamentary Union (1973–76) and Indian High Commissioner to Canada (1980–82).

Early life

On 6 August 1915, Gurdial Singh Dhillon was born in the Panjwar 
, some 20 kilometres west of Amritsar city in Punjab into a Dhillon Jat family, He was descendants of Bhangi misl rulers. He studied at Khalsa College, Amritsar and Government College, Lahore before graduating in Law from Punjab University Law College in Lahore. He played an active role in the Harse Chhina Mogha Morcha rebellion in 1947.

Political career

Dhillon was a member of the Punjab Legislative Assembly (1952–1967), where he was its Deputy Speaker (1952–54) and its Speaker (1954–62). In 1967 he was first elected to the Lok Sabha, the lower House of the Indian Parliament representing Tarn Taran parliamentary constituency. He was elected from Firozpur in 1985.

Dhillon served two terms as Speaker of Lok Sabha (1969–71 and 1971–75) and was Minister of Agriculture in the Indian Government (1986–1988). Regarding his time in Parliament, his biography on the Lok Sabha website expresses the following: 

With Kartar Singh, he co-authored a series of eight children's books in the early 1970s entitled 'Stories from Sikh History'.

Having undergone heart bypass surgery, Dr. Dhillon died at the All India Institute of Medical Sciences, New Delhi on 23 March 1992 following a heart attack.

See also
 Harse Chhina Mogha Morcha

References

External links
 Gurdial Singh Dhillon materials in the South Asian American Digital Archive (SAADA)
The woes of Lok Sabha Speaker: A graphic account of the Speaker’s woes was given by Mr. G.S. Dhillon

High Commissioners of India to Canada
Indian Sikhs
1915 births
1992 deaths
People from Amritsar district
Punjabi people
Speakers of the Lok Sabha
India MPs 1967–1970
India MPs 1971–1977
Punjab University Law College alumni
Government College University, Lahore alumni
Lok Sabha members from Punjab, India
India MPs 1984–1989
Speakers of the Punjab Legislative Assembly
Agriculture Ministers of India
Indian National Congress politicians
People from Firozpur district
People from Tarn Taran district
Prisoners and detainees of British India